Xenophanes is a lunar impact crater that is located along the northwestern limb of the Moon. It is nearly attached to Volta, a similar formation to the south-southwest. To the northeast is the smaller crater Cleostratus. Xenophanes is significantly foreshortened when viewed from the Earth, hindering observation.

It is a worn and eroded crater with a battered outer rim that is overlaid by several smaller craters. The rim is a circular range of rugged, irregular ground that is notched in places along the inner wall. A chain of small craters lies along the northern and northeastern rim. At the west end, a pair of clefts in the rim nearly join the floor to the surface beyond. To the northeast, Xenophanes A is an impact crater with a sharp rim and a rough interior.

The interior surface is irregular, but sections have been resurfaced by basaltic lava. A pair of flooded crater rims lie along the southern and northeast sections of the interior. The interior is more level and less rough at the eastern end.

Satellite craters
By convention these features are identified on lunar maps by placing the letter on the side of the crater midpoint that is closest to Xenophanes.

References

 
 
 
 
 
 
 
 
 
 
 
 

Impact craters on the Moon